Capital District most commonly refers to the Capital District of New York, the metropolitan area surrounding Albany, the capital city of New York State.

It may also refer to:
 Capital districts and territories, specially designated administrative divisions
 Capital region, a region or district surrounding a capital city
 Capital District (Venezuela), a federal district
 Capital Regional District, a local government administrative district in British Columbia, Canada
 Capital District (VHSL), a district of the Virginia High School League

See also

Capital districts and territories
 Capital region (disambiguation)
 District (disambiguation)
 Capital (disambiguation)
 Capitol (disambiguation)